The Field Elm cultivar Ulmus minor 'Erecta' was identified by Loudon in Arboretum et Fruticetum Britannicum, 3: 1396, 1838 as Ulmus campestris var erecta.

Description
Loudon described the tree as having "a tall, narrow head, resembling the Cornish Elm, but differing from that tree in having much broader leaves, and a corky bark".

Cultivation
No specimens are known to survive.

References

Field elm cultivar
Ulmus articles missing images
Ulmus
Missing elm cultivars